Zilli may refer to:

 Bar Zilli, building in central Asmara, Eritrea
 Zilli (surname), surname

See also
 Celje, Slovenia